December Makes Me Feel This Way is the fourth studio album by saxophone player Dave Koz. Koz's first holiday album was released by Capitol Records on September 23, 1997. Koz himself provides vocal on album title track "December Makes Me Feel This Way." The album peaked at number 2 on Billboards Top Contemporary Jazz Albums chart.

Track listing

 Personnel 
 Dave Koz – alto saxophone, baritone saxophone, soprano saxophone, tenor saxophone, keyboards, acoustic piano, vocals (9)
 Phil Parlapiano – keyboards, acoustic piano, Wurlitzer electric piano, Hammond B3 organ, pump organ, Mellotron, celesta, accordion, acoustic guitar, mandolin
 Doug Pettibone – acoustic guitar, electric guitar, bass guitar 
 Bruce Watson – acoustic guitar, electric guitar, slide guitar, lap steel guitar, mandolin, harmonica
 Jeff Koz – nylon guitar (5)
 David Piltch – acoustic bass
 Stephen Théard – drums, percussion, bells, trash cans 
 Lisa Haley – fiddle (11)
 Victoria Shaw – backing vocals
 Phil Hartman – narrator

 Production 
 Bruce Lundvall – executive producer 
 Dave Koz – producer, arrangements 
 Thom Panunzio – producer, engineer, mixing 
 David Bryant – assistant engineer 
 Nick Els – assistant engineer
 Bob Salcedo – assistant engineer 
 John Aguto – mix assistant 
 Steve Hall – mastering 
 Valerie Pack – production coordinator 
 Jeffrey Fey – art direction, design 
 Tommy Steele – art direction
 Robert Zuckerman – photography 
 Vision Management – management Studios'
 Recorded at Groove Masters (Santa Monica, California), House of Blues Studio (Encino, California) and Studio Seven (Hollywood, California).
 Mixed at Groove Masters
 Mastered at Future Disc (Hollywood, California).

Charts

References

Dave Koz albums
Capitol Records Christmas albums
Instrumental albums
1997 Christmas albums
Christmas albums by American artists
Jazz Christmas albums